Agbetu is a surname. Notable people with the surname include:

Akeem Agbetu (born 1988), Nigerian footballer
Toyin Agbetu, British activist, community educator, and filmmaker

Surnames of Nigerian origin